Redroofs is an unincorporated settlement in British Columbia, located south of Halfmoon Bay on the Sunshine Coast.

References

Settlements in British Columbia
Populated places in the Sunshine Coast Regional District